Tyrosine-protein kinase transmembrane receptor ROR2, also known as neurotrophic tyrosine kinase, receptor-related 2, is a protein that in humans is encoded by the ROR2 gene located on position 9 of the long arm of chromosome 9. This protein is responsible for aspects of bone and cartilage growth. It is involved in Robinow syndrome and autosomal dominant brachydactyly type B. ROR2 is a member of the receptor tyrosine kinase-like orphan receptor (ROR) family.

Function 

The protein encoded by this gene is a receptor tyrosine kinase and type I transmembrane protein that belongs to the ROR subfamily of cell surface receptors. The protein may be involved in the early formation of the chondrocytes and may be required for cartilage and growth plate development.

Clinical significance 

Mutations in this gene can cause brachydactyly type B, a skeletal disorder characterized by hypoplasia/aplasia of distal phalanges and nails. In addition, mutations in this gene can cause the autosomal recessive form of Robinow syndrome, which is characterized by skeletal dysplasia with generalized limb bone shortening, segmental defects of the spine, brachydactyly, and a dysmorphic facial appearance.

References

Further reading

External links 
 GeneReviews/NCBI/NIH/UW entry on ROR2-Related Robinow Syndrome
 
 ROR2 Mutations Cause Brachydactyly Type B and Robinow Syndrome

Tyrosine kinase receptors